Anacamptodes defectaria, the brown-shaded gray moth, is a moth of the  family Geometridae. It is found from Pennsylvania, west to Iowa and Kansas, south to Texas, and south and east to Florida.

The wingspan is about 30 mm. Adults are on wing from February to November depending on the location.

The larvae feed on oak, poplar, sweet cherry and willow.

External links
Bug Guide
Images

Boarmiini
Moths described in 1857
Moths of North America